Ion Șerb, also Ioan Șerb (January 11, 1926 — January 5, 2004) was a  general of the Socialist Republic of Romania accused of the espionage for the Soviet Union.

A declassified CIA document states the following. Romanian counter-intelligence monitored several high-rank officers suspecting them in sympathies for the Soviet Union. In 1971 unauthorized documents were found during the search of the house of Ion Șerb, and in subsequent interrogations he confessed he was recruited by the Soviet military attache to Romania, Aleksandr Fyodorovich Musatov. In order to avoid confrontation with the Soviet Union,  Șerb was not prosecuted, but demoted to the rank of private.

References

Further reading
"Biografia unui spion sovietic: generalul Ion Şerb", in: Caietele CNSAS, annul IV, nr. 1-2 (7-8)/2011, Editura CNSAS, București, 2013

1926 births
2004 deaths
Romanian generals
Romanian spies for the Soviet Union